Commodore Joseph Deane (c. 1731 – 12 January 1780) was a senior Royal Navy officer who served as Commander-in-Chief, North American Station from September 1766 to November 1766.

Naval career
Deane joined the Royal Navy in 1746. Promoted to captain on 17 October 1758, he was given command of the sixth-rate . He went on to command the sixth-rate  and saw action during the siege of Quebec in 1760. He went on to command the fifth-rate  and then the sixth-rate  before briefly serving as Commander-in-Chief, North American Station from September 1766 to November 1766. After that, he commanded, successively, the fifth-rate , the third-rate  and, finally, the third-rate  and took part in the action of 7 March 1779.

Deane died at Port Royal in Jamaica, on 12 January 1780.

References

Royal Navy commodores
1731 births
1780 deaths